Aulad may refer to:

Aulad (1954 film)
Aulad (1962 film)
Aulad (1968 film)
Aulad (1987 film)